Marcus Bossett is an American mixed martial artist who competed in the Heavyweight division.

Mixed martial arts record

|-
| Loss
| align=center| 1–3
| Steve Nelmark
| Submission (choke)
| UFC - Ultimate Ultimate 1996
| 
| align=center| 1
| align=center| 1:37
| Birmingham, Alabama, United States
| 
|-
| Loss
| align=center| 1–2
| Carl Franks
| Submission (armbar)
| UFCF - United Full Contact Federation 1
| 
| align=center| 1
| align=center| 8:00
| 
| 
|-
| Loss
| align=center| 1–1
| Dan Severn
| Submission (arm-triangle choke)
| UFC 4 - Revenge of the Warriors
| 
| align=center| 1
| align=center| 0:52
| Tulsa, Oklahoma, United States
| 
|-
| Win
| align=center| 1–0
| Eldo Dias Xavier
| KO (strikes)
| UFC 4 - Revenge of the Warriors
| 
| align=center| 1
| align=center| 4:55
| Tulsa, Oklahoma, United States
|

See also
List of male mixed martial artists

References

External links
 
 
 Marcus Bossett at mixedmartialarts.com

American male mixed martial artists
Heavyweight mixed martial artists
Living people
Year of birth missing (living people)
Ultimate Fighting Championship male fighters